The Golden Warrior Monument (also known as the Golden Man Statue, Statue of the Golden Warrior and Independence Monument) stands on Republic Square in the former capital of Kazakhstan, Almaty. The monument celebrates the independence of Kazakhstan, the identity of its people, and the role of the city of Almaty as capital of Kazakhstan until 1997 when the capital moved to Astana.

The design of the monument was inspired by Kazakh folklore and the 1969 archaeological discovery of an 18 year old Second or Third Century BC Saka or Scythian noble buried in a golden suit of armor with a sizable hoard of gold, earning him the moniker "Golden Man".

The column is framed with artistic casting crate, which describes the historical events of Kazakhstan.

Architecture 
The exposition of the complex stretches horizontally for 180 meters. The center of the composition is a vertical plastic stele, reminiscent of the relief Mangyshlak kulpytas, and has a height of 28 meters. It ends with the "Golden Man" (6 meters in height) - the ruler, who stands controlling the winged leopard and symbolizes the firm state power on the Kazakh land. The stele is mounted on a semicircular pedestal, which is placed in the center of a paved circular platform. The stele fixes a certain point in space, being placed against the background of two high-rise buildings. The closer you get to it, the sharper and more dynamic it rushes into the sky. At the bottom of the stele are carved the words (in Kazakh and Russian): "On December 25, 1990, the state sovereignty of Kazakhstan was proclaimed." "December 16, 1991 State Independence of Kazakhstan was proclaimed".

At the foot of the stele, on the stylobate is a sculptural group consisting of allegorical figures of the "Sage of the Sky", "Mother Earth" and two children on foals. The figures are placed on the four sides of the world, from where the life-giving moisture that makes the earth fruitful comes. The child riders symbolize youth and the great future of the republic. On the other hand, the father, mother and children make up the family, the foundation of the state. These figures are inscribed in a square, representing stability and strength.

The column is framed by trims of artistic castings on which the historical events of Kazakhstan are described.

On both sides of the stele in a horseshoe shape, in a circle, are placed 10 bas-reliefs, which reveal the history of Kazakhstan from ancient times to the present day. The number 10 is not accidental: according to Pythagoras, it is the number of prosperity, well-being, strength and power. Of course, this is not a chronological order of events, but the artistic and plastic expression of its individual striking stages.

Gallery

Facts 

 In October 2007, unknown persons stole a fragment of the Independence Monument - a bronze book with the imprint of the palm of the president of Kazakhstan. The book was restored three weeks later. The foundry model of the Book, stored at the JSC Kirov Machine-Building Plant
 The wish book says "Choose and Bliss".
 The specialists of the Kirov Machine-Building Plant (Almaty) took an active part in the production and installation of the Monument; the bronze castings of the bas-reliefs and sculptures were pre-installed in the workshop and presented to the author's team, and after the corrections and approval the castings were installed on the Republic Square. For information, the Book was cast using a non-standard chemical composition of the alloy copper (special brass) and other elements of the Mendeleev table, the alloy content included special metals to give special properties - strength and corrosion resistance.
 Each art casting element bears the abbreviation of the manufacturer of the art casting - Kirov Machine-Tool Plant.

References

Statues in Kazakhstan
Buildings and structures in Almaty
Tourist attractions in Almaty
Monuments and memorials in Kazakhstan